Nationalist revolution may refer to:

The Revolutions of 1848 in Europe, which included many nationalist revolts
The Xinhai Revolution of China in 1911, which overthrew the Emperor of China
The Northern Expedition of China in 1928, when the Kuomintang took power
The Révolution nationale in France in the 1940s, the ideological program of Vichy France
The Indonesian National Revolution in 1945–1949, the Indonesian War of Independence